Theo Kogan (born December 23, 1969) is an American singer, songwriter, model, and actress. She is best known as the vocalist of the all-girl punk band Lunachicks. She also sang in the dance/electronic band Theo & the Skyscrapers. She also has her own cosmetic line, Armour Beauty. She is married to Sean Pierce, the guitarist of Theo & the Skyscrapers and the Toilet Böys.

Career
Kogan has had roles in movies such as Zoolander, Rock Star, In the Cut, Bringing Out the Dead, and High Times' Potluck. She has also appeared on Law & Order: Special Victims Unit, Third Watch and The Jon Stewart Show. She has done voice over work for Live Freaky! Die Freaky!
Kogan can also be seen in Screen Test, a Broadway musical directed by Rob Roth which her band Theo and the Skyscrapers composed the music for.

Kogan has modelled in ad campaigns for Calvin Klein, Rimmel, and Kenneth Cole.

Filmography

Film

Television

References

External links
Kogan's beauty line

Theo & The Skyscrapers on Myspace

1969 births
American cosmetics businesspeople
Female models from New York (state)
American women singers
American film actresses
American punk rock singers
Businesspeople from New York City
Living people
Women punk rock singers
Actresses from New York City
Musicians from Brooklyn
21st-century American women